Stoke Common Meadows is a biological Site of Special Scientific Interest in north Wiltshire, England.

The SSSI was notified in 1994 for the botanical diversity found in its traditionally managed hay meadows.

The site is managed as a nature reserve by Wiltshire Wildlife Trust, together with the larger Blakehill Farm reserve which is adjacent to the north-east.

References

Sites of Special Scientific Interest in Wiltshire
Sites of Special Scientific Interest notified in 1994
Wiltshire Wildlife Trust reserves
Meadows in Wiltshire